Londonthorpe and Harrowby Without is  a civil parish in the South Kesteven district of Lincolnshire, England. According to the 2001 Census it had a population of 4,344, in 1743 households, increasing to a population of 5,133 at the 2011 census. It includes the village of Londonthorpe and the hamlet of Harrowby, Lincolnshire.

Originally a township of Grantham, Harrowby was created a civil parish in 1866, and in 1894 it was split into two separate civil parishes, Harrowby Within, and Harrowby Without. In 1909 Harrowby Within was abolished and merged with the town of Grantham.  In October 1930 Harrowby Without was reduced in size to enlarge the town, and in 1931 the parish was abolished and merged with Londonthorpe and Spittlegate Without to create Londonthorpe and Harrowby Without civil parish.

Geography
The parish is bounded on the east by the High Dyke (Ermine Street), the modern B6403 road. The Southern boundary follows traditional field lines from  near  Griffs Plantation westwards to cross the River Witham at  just north of Saltersford. The parish includes a small amount of land on the West bank of the Witham. The western boundary from here crosses the industrial works of Aveling Barford, and Somerby Hill, and encloses roughly half of Halls Hill (west of Harrowby Hall) (see ).

The parish is crossed east–west by the main A52 road and generally by several minor roads to the villages and to the Alma Park industrial estate.

Land in the parish is gently undulating, particularly around Belton Park and the south-eastern corner near Little Ponton. The area of Belton Park bordered by the Witham is around 50M altitude, and the land generally rises toward the east. Around the High Dyke it is flatter, and around 120M above sea level.

The bedrock of the Eastern Londonthorpe Parish and the High Dyke is Upper Lincolnshire limestone. To the west, on in Belton park and around Alma Park the ground is formed of Mudstones, of the Whitby type, or the Charmouth formation further to the west. This western end of Belton Park, over the Charmouth mudstones, carries a superficial post-glacial deposit known as the Belton Sand And Gravel. The valley of the Witham includes its own alluvial deposits of clay, silt and Gravel.

References

External links

Civil parishes in Lincolnshire
South Kesteven District